Kazuki Takahashi (born 6 October 1996) is a Japanese footballer who plays as a midfielder for Bucheon FC.

Career

Before the second half of 2016–17, Takahashi signed for Montenegrin second tier side Igalo. Before the 2018 season, he signed for Jaro in the Finnish second tier. Before the second half of 2018–19, he signed for Romanian third tier club FC U Craiova.

In 2019, Takahashi signed for Pandurii in the Romanian second tier. In 2020, he signed for Swedish team AFC Eskilstuna. In January 2022, before the second half of the 2021–22 season, he signed a one-and-a-half year contract with Pirin Blagoevgrad in Bulgaria. On 3 April 2022, Takahashi debuted for Pirin in a 0–3 loss to Levski Sofia.

References

External links
 

1996 births
AFC Eskilstuna players
Association football midfielders
Association football people from Chiba Prefecture
CS Pandurii Târgu Jiu players
Expatriate footballers in Bulgaria
Expatriate footballers in Finland
Expatriate footballers in Montenegro
Expatriate footballers in Romania
FC U Craiova 1948 players
FF Jaro players
First Professional Football League (Bulgaria) players
FK Igalo 1929 players
Japanese expatriate footballers
Japanese expatriate sportspeople in Finland
Japanese expatriate sportspeople in Montenegro
Japanese expatriate sportspeople in Romania
Japanese footballers
Liga II players
Living people
Montenegrin Second League players
OFC Pirin Blagoevgrad players
People from Noda, Chiba
Superettan players
Ykkönen players